Matthias Bartke (born 16 January 1959) is a German politician of the Social Democratic Party of Germany (SPD) who served as a member of the German Bundestag from 2013 to 2021. From January 2016 held the position of legal advisor and thus a member of the executive board of the SPD Parliamentary Group.

Early life and education
Bartke grew up in Fischerhude near Bremen. After his Abitur in 1978, he finished his military service in Rotenburg an der Wümme. He studied law in University of Hamburg (1981-1987). After that he worked as a lawyer in Altona, Hamburg. From 1987 till 1991 he was a research consultant at the Institute for Peace Research and Security Policy (IFSH) at the University of Hamburg. He holds a doctoral degree in law. He complete his PhD (Thesis: "Defence mission of the Bundeswehr: a constitutional law analysis" („Verteidigungsauftrag der Bundeswehr: eine verfassungsrechtliche Analyse“) in 1991.

Early career
In 1991 Bartke entered the civil service in Hamburg. He had various executive positions at the Social Security Office of Hamburg at the department for Labour and Social affairs, Family and Integration. After the Hamburg state election of 2011, he was the office manager of Senator for Social Affairs, Detlef Scheele. From January 1, 2013 until his election as a Member of the German Bundestag Bartke was the manager of the legal department of the Social Security Office of Hamburg.

Until 2014 he was the board chairman of the Foundation Lawaetz.

Political career
Bartke has been a member of the SPD since 1978. He was an active member of the Jusos and a member of the district committee of Jusos in Altona. Bartke was a member of the district assembly of Altona, Hamburg from 1986 till 1989. He was then elected as the chairman of the SPD Altona North-District. In 1996 he was elected as a member of the SPD Altona-District Executive, where he served temporarily as Chairman in 2008. Bartke was a member of the SPD-state board between 2008 and 2010. He was the founder chairman of the consortium "Selbst aktiv" for people with disabilities in SPD Hamburg.

Member of the German Bundestag, 2013–2021
Bartke first became a Member of the German Bundestag in the 2013 federal elections, after winning in the electoral district of Altona, Hamburg, with 34.9% of the first votes.

Throughout his time in parliament, Bartke served on the Committee for Labour and Social Affairs, with a main focus on labour and disability policy; he was elected chairman of the committee in March 2018. In addition, Bartke was a member of the parliament’s Council of Elders and of the Committee for the Scrutiny of Elections, Immunity and the Rules of Procedure since January 2016. From 2013 until 2017, he was also a member of the Committee on Legal Affairs and Consumer Protection, where he served as his parliamentary group’s rapporteur on human trafficking, conservatorship and cooperatives, and a substitute member of the Committee on Foreign Affairs.

In addition to his committee assignments, Bartke also served as vice-chairman of the German-Japanese Parliamentary Friendship Group. Within the SPD parliamentary group, he belonged to the Parliamentary Left, a left-wing movement.

Other activities
 Sozialverband Deutschland, Member
 German United Services Trade Union (ver.di), Member
 Arbeiterwohlfahrt, Member

Personal life
Bartke is married and has one son.

References

External links 

 Homepage of Matthias Bartke (in German)
 Biography, speeches and vote history of Matthias Bartke on the Website of the German Bundestag (in German)
 Facebook page of Matthias Bartke

1959 births
University of Hamburg alumni
Living people
Members of the Bundestag 2017–2021
Members of the Bundestag for Hamburg
Members of the Bundestag 2013–2017
Members of the Bundestag for the Social Democratic Party of Germany